Boot Camp is the only studio album released by rap duo Lil Soldiers. It was released on April 27, 1999 through No Limit Records and was produced by Beats By the Pound.

Track listing
"Soulja Style" (featuring Magic) - 3:45  
"Where the Little Souljas At?"- 4:36  
"Tank in My Hand"- 3:55 (featuring Mia X) 
"I Ain't Livin' Right"- 4:01 (featuring Ghetto Commission) 
"Close 2 You"- 3:14 (featuring Mo B. Dick)
"School on Lock"- 3:22  
"Get Up"- 3:12  
"Mama Need a New Blouse"- 2:38 (featuring Short Circuit) 
"School Yard Battlin'"- 3:29  
"Chipped Out Tank"- 3:54  
"For My Shorties"- 2:36 (featuring Fiend) 
"Close 2 a Bomb"- 3:24  
"Best in the World"- 3:05  
"Soulja by Blood"- 3:48  
"Bring It 2 You"- 3:16  
"Okey Dokey"- 2:35 (featuring Odell)
"Shout It Out"- 3:31 (featuring Young Gunz-Reginelli & Melchoir)

1999 debut albums
No Limit Records albums
Priority Records albums